Stockley Park is a business estate and public country park located between Hayes, Yiewsley and West Drayton in the London Borough of Hillingdon. In August 2020 it was listed in the Register of Historic Parks and Gardens of Special Historic Interest in England as Grade II. Stockley Park is the home of the VAR hub.

Residents
Stockley Park is home to companies and corporations including Apple Inc., Gilead Sciences, Canon Inc., Sharp Corporation, Toshiba, Verifone, Samsonite, and Marks and Spencer. Since 2019, the Premier League's video assistant referee (VAR) operation has been run from IMG Studios, the home of Premier League Productions, a joint venture between IMG and the Premier League.

Facilities
Stockley Country Park has a network of footpaths and bridleways in its 274 acres of parkland.
Stockley Park Golf Club has a 18 hole championship course with a bar and restaurant.
The Gould Green Riding School provides horse riding lessons in the Country Park.
In the Stockley Park Arena area there is a Nuffield Health fitness and wellbeing gym, Costa Coffee, Greggs, Subway.    
Travelodge London Stockley Park is an 80 room hotel with a Bar Cafe.

Transport

Buses
The park is served by three London bus routes: 
A10: Uxbridge station to Heathrow Central bus station 
350: Millington Road, Hayes to Heathrow Terminal 5 
U5: Uxbridge station to Hayes & Harlington station

Rail
The Great Western Main Line runs to the south of Stockley Park. Hayes & Harlington railway station is located 0.7 miles (1.2 km) to the south-east. TfL Rail operates a stopping service between London Paddington and Reading and London Paddington to Heathrow Terminal 4. Great Western Railway operates a stopping service between London Paddington and Didcot Parkway. West Drayton railway station is located 1.1 miles (1.7 km) south-west of Stockley Park. It has the same services as Hayes and Harlington station with the exception of the service to Heathrow Terminal 5.

Air
Heathrow Airport lies 2.3 miles (3.5 km) south of Stockley Park.

Development
The estate was developed by Stanhope PLC and designed by Arup Group from 1984. A Phase II development was added between 1990 and 1998.

History

The land which became Stockley Park lay in two ancient Middlesex parishes, Hillingdon Parish in the west and Harlington Parish in the east. In the Harlington Parish what became the eastern part of Stockley Park was within the estate of Dawley Manor and later the Dawley Wall farm. In Hillingdon Parish the land lay within Colham Manor.

After the cutting of the Grand Junction Canal (renamed Grand Union Canal in 1929) land was leased for brick-earth and later gravel and sand extraction. When deposits were exhausted some of the pits that were produced were used to deposit waste by barge from London. With the development of the Park in 1984-1985 approximately five million tonnes of waste was moved in the creation of the business park, the largest civil engineering contract involving landfill transfer in Europe.

Toponymy of the hamlet of Stockley

Broad & Company's 1912 circular announcing the renaming Starveall (Starvhall) to Stockley
Stockley Park takes its name from the former hamlet of Stockley. 'Stockley' is believed to be a portmanteau word derived from Cowley stock, the generic name given to the locally produced brick in West Middlesex. The hamlet of Stockley came into being with the renaming of the hamlet of Starveall (or Starvhall) in 1912.

Starveall was located in the ancient parish of Hillingdon, lying south of the Grand Junction Canal. The name is a common and possibly humorous description in central southern England for land of poor fertility - (Starve all).

By the middle of the 19th century a significant brickfield has been established to the west of Starveall farm. An arm known as Starveall dock (and also as Pocock's or Broad’s dock) was cut from the Grand Junction Canal to service the brickfield. In 1872 it was extended south of the farm into the Parish of West Drayton, reaching a distance of 1120 yards from the mainline of the canal. In 1879 the leaseholder of Starveall, Samuel Pocock, stated he made 15-20 million bricks per year there. In 1884 Pocock conveyed his interests to Clement Burgess Broad and George Harris, of South Wharf, Paddington.

The hamlet of Starveall continued to grow. However by 1911 its descriptive name must have been of concern to its inhabitants as on 1 January 1912 Broad & Co issued a circular stating the following:

The Directors of Broad and Co., Ltd beg to inform you that in response to the general desire of their tenantry, and others concerned at Starvhall, West Drayton, to have a ‘more suitable designation of the place and works than that of “Starvhall and “Starvhall Brickfields,” they have decided, as from this date, to re-name the place “Stockley” and the works to be known as “Stockley Works." 

Starveall was located within the Yiewsley Urban District and Broad & Co unilateral renaming of Starveall caused some disquiet at the Council meeting on Tuesday 9 January 1912. It was pointed out that Broad & Co had thought that they could rename Starveall without sanction and afterwards had realised their mistake and had written to the council asking them to pass a resolution confirming their action. Council member Mr J.A. Holland stated ‘It is entirely out of order: they ought first to have applied to this Council.’ However there was general agreement with the name change. Vice-Chairman of the council Mr T. Hancock stated ‘he saw no reason why the name should not be altered. Starveall was not a correct name, for nobody had been starved there.’ (Laughter) 

Starveall was subsequently expunged, with Starveall Road, Starveall Farm, Starveall School, Starveall Church Mission hall, Starveall Football Club, Starveall Dock, and Starveall Brickworks all being renamed Stockley. The only reference to Starveall today lies on the canal network managed by the Canal & River Trust. The Grand Union Canal Bridge 195 is still known as Starveall Bridge.

During the First World War the Royal Naval Air Service had barracks at their Stockley Depot. Approximately 70 men of Stockley served in the armed forces in the war with 11 giving their lives in the conflict. A war memorial tablet bearing their names was erected outside the mission hall which was unveiled in a ceremony on 6 January 1921.
 
Stockley continued to be a centre of brick production through the 1920's. However the resources of brick-earth began to become depleted. By 1930 the Stockley brickworks were producing only two million bricks a year. In 1935 the brickworks was closed down.

The hamlet of Stockley, without its raison d'etre, diminished after this time and the area was absorbed into an expanding West Drayton. Today Stockley Close Industrial estate lies where the centre of the hamlet once stood. To the industrial estate's east and south lies a truncated 409 yard section of the Stockley Dock. Some of the buildings of Stockley Farm remain and to its west lies a small local park, Stockley Recreation Ground.

See also

Heathrow Junction railway station

References

External links
Stockley Park
The Arena Stockley Park
Stockley Park Golf Course

Business parks of England
Buildings and structures in the London Borough of Hillingdon
Information technology company headquarters in the United Kingdom